The Union Stock Yard & Transit Co., or The Yards, was the meatpacking district in Chicago for more than a century, starting in 1865. The district was operated by a group of railroad companies that acquired marshland and turned it into a centralized processing area. By the 1890s, the railroad capital behind the Union Stockyards was Vanderbilt money. The Union Stockyards operated in the New City community area for 106 years, helping Chicago become known as the "hog butcher for the world," the center of the American meatpacking industry for decades. The yards became inspiration for literature, and social reform. 

The stockyards became the focal point of the rise of some of the earliest international companies. These refined industrial innovations and influenced financial markets. Both the rise and fall of the district reflect the evolution of transportation services and technology in America. The stockyards have become an integral part of the popular culture of Chicago's history. They are considered one of the chief drivers that empowered the animal–industrial complex into its modern form.

From the Civil War until the 1920s and peaking in 1924, more meat was processed in Chicago than in any other place in the world. Construction began in June 1865 with an opening on Christmas Day in 1865. The Yards closed at midnight on Friday, July 30, 1971, after several decades of decline during the decentralization of the meatpacking industry. The Union Stock Yard Gate was designated a Chicago Landmark on February 24, 1972, and a National Historic Landmark on May 29, 1981.

History

Before construction of the various private stockyards, tavern owners provided pastures and care for cattle herds waiting to be sold. With the spreading service of railroads, several small stockyards were created in and around the city of Chicago. In 1848, a stockyard called the Bulls Head Market was opened to the public. The Bulls Head Stock Yards were located at Madison Street and Ogden Avenue. In the years that followed, several small stockyards were scattered throughout the city. Between 1852 and 1865, five railroads were constructed to Chicago. The stockyards that sprang up were usually built along various rail lines of these new railroad companies. Some railroads built their own stockyards in Chicago. The Illinois Central and the Michigan Central railroads combined to build the largest set of pens on the lake shore east of Cottage Grove Avenue from 29th Street to 35th Street. In 1878, the New York Central Railroad managed to buy a controlling interest in the Michigan Central Railroad. In this way, Cornelius Vanderbilt, owner of the New York Central Railroad, got his start in the stockyard business in Chicago.

Several factors contributed to consolidation of the Chicago stockyards: westward expansion of railroads between 1850 and 1870, which drove great commercial growth in Chicago as a major railroad center, and the Mississippi River blockade during the Civil War that closed all north–south river trade. The United States government purchased a great deal of beef and pork to feed the Union troops fighting the Civil War. As a consequence, hog receipts at the Chicago stockyards rose from 392,000 hogs in 1860 to 1,410,000 hogs over the winter butchering season of 1864–1865; over the same time period, beef receipts in Chicago rose from 117,000 head to 338,000 head. With an influx of butchers and small meat packing concerns, the number of businesses greatly increased to process the flood of livestock being shipped to the Chicago stockyards. The goal was to butcher and process the livestock locally rather than transferring it to other northern cities for butchering and processing. Keeping up with the huge number of animals arriving each day proved impossible until a new wave of consolidation and modernization altered the meatpacking business in the post-Civil War era.

The Union Stock Yards, designed to consolidate operations, was built in 1864 on marshland south of the city. It was south and west of the earlier stock yards in an area bounded by Halsted Street on the east, South Racine Avenue on the west, with 39th Street as the northern boundary and 47th Street as the southern boundary. Led by the Alton, Chicago & St. Louis Railroad and the Lake Shore and Michigan Southern Railway, a consortium of nine railroad companies (hence the "Union" name) acquired the  marshland area in southwest Chicago for US$100,000 in 1864. In 1864, the Union Stock Yards were located just outside the southern boundary of the city of Chicago. Within five years, the area was incorporated into the city.

Eventually, the  site had 2300 separate livestock pens, room to accommodate 75,000 hogs, 21,000 cattle and 22,000 sheep at any one time. Additionally, hotels, saloons, restaurants, and offices for merchants and brokers sprang up in the growing community around the stockyards. Led by Timothy Blackstone, a founder and the first president of the Union Stock Yards and Transit Company, "The Yards" experienced tremendous growth. Processing two million animals yearly by 1870, in two decades the number rose to nine million by 1890. Between 1865 and 1900, approximately 400 million livestock were butchered within the confines of the Yards.

By the start of the 20th century, the stockyards employed 25,000 people and produced 82 percent of the domestic meat consumed nationally. In 1921, the stockyards employed 40,000 people. Two thousand men worked directly for the Union Stock Yard & Transit Co., and the rest worked for companies such as meatpackers, which had plants in the stockyards. By 1900, the  stockyard contained  of road, and had  of track along its perimeter.

At one time,  a day of Chicago River water were pumped into the stockyards. So much stockyard waste drained into the South Fork of the river that it was called Bubbly Creek due to the gaseous products of decomposition. The creek bubbles to this day. When the city permanently reversed the flow of the Chicago River in 1900, the intent was to prevent the Stock Yards' waste products, along with other sewage, from flowing into Lake Michigan and contaminating the city's drinking water.

The meatpacking district was served between 1908 and 1957 by a short Chicago 'L' line with several stops, devoted primarily to the daily transport of thousands of workers and even tourists to the site. The line was constructed when the city of Chicago forced the removal of surface trackage on 40th Street.

Evolving methods of transportation and distribution led to declining business and the closing of the Union Stock Yards in 1971. National Wrecking Company negotiated a contract whereby National Wrecking cleared a 102-acre site and removed some 50 acres of animal pens, auxiliary buildings and the eight-story Exchange Building. It took approximately eight months to complete the job and ready the site for the building of an industrial park.

Effect on industry

The area and scale of the stockyards, along with technological advancements in rail transport and refrigeration, allowed for the creation of some of America's first truly global companies led by entrepreneurs such as Gustavus Franklin Swift and Philip Danforth Armour. Philip Armour was the first person to build a modern large-scale meatpacking plant in Chicago in 1867. The Armour plant was built at 45th Street and Elizabeth Avenue immediately to the west of the Union Stockyards. This new plant employed the modern "assembly line" (or rather dis-assembly line) method of work. The mechanized process with its killing wheel and conveyors helped inspire the automobile assembly line that Henry Ford popularized in 1913.<ref>Down on the Killing Floor: Black and White Workers in Chicago's Packinghouses, 1904–1954, p. 8.</ref> For a time the Armour plant, located on a 12-acre site, was renowned as the largest factory in the world.

In addition, hedging transactions by the stockyard companies were pivotal in the establishment and growth of the Chicago-based commodity exchanges and futures markets. Selling on the futures market allowed the seller to have a guaranteed price at a set time in the future. This was extremely helpful to those sellers who expected their cattle or hogs to come to market with a glut of other cattle or hogs when prices might necessarily be substantially lower than the guaranteed futures price.

Following the arrival of Armour in 1867, Gustav Swift's company arrived in Chicago in 1875 and built another modern large-scale meatpacking plant at 42nd Street and South Justine Street. The Morris Company built a meatpacking plant at 42nd Street and Elizabeth Street. The Hammond Company and the Wilson Company also built meatpacking plants in the area west of the Chicago stockyards.J'Nell L. Pate, Livestock Hotels: America's Historic Stockyards, p. 161. Eventually, meatpacking byproduct manufacturing of leather, soap, fertilizer, glue (such as the large glue factory located at 44th Street and Loomis Street), pharmaceuticals, imitation ivory, gelatin, shoe polish, buttons, perfume, and violin strings prospered in the neighborhood. Additionally, there was a "Hair Factory", located at 44th Street and Ashland Avenue, which processed hair from butchered animals into saleable items.

Next to the Union Stock Yards, the International Amphitheatre building was built on the west side of Halsted Street at 42nd Street in the 1930s, originally to hold the annual International Live Stock Exposition which began in 1900. It became a venue for many national conventions.

Historian William Cronon concludes:
Because of the Chicago packers, ranchers in Wyoming and feedlot farmers in Iowa regularly found a reliable market for their animals, and on average received better prices for the animals they sold there. At the same time and for the same reason, Americans of all classes found a greater variety of more and better meats on their tables, purchased on average at lower prices than ever before. Seen in this light, the packers' "rigid system of economy" seemed a very good thing indeed.

Fires

The first Chicago Union Stock Yards fire started on December 22, 1910, destroying $400,000 of property and killing twenty-one firemen, including the Fire Marshal James J. Horan. Fifty engine companies and seven hook and ladder companies fought the fire until it was declared extinguished by Chief Seyferlich on December 23. In 2004, a memorial to all Chicago firefighters who have died in the line of duty was erected just behind the Union Stock Yards Gate at the intersection of Exchange Avenue and Peoria Street.

A larger fire occurred on Saturday, May 19, 1934, which burned almost 90 percent of the stockyards, including the Exchange Building, the Stock Yard Inn, and the International Livestock Exposition building. The 1934 Stock Yards fire was seen as far away as Indiana, and caused approximately $6 million worth of damages. One employee and 8,000 head of cattle died. The yards were in business the following Sunday evening.

Workers and unions
Following the opening of the new Union Stockyards on December 25, 1865, a community of workers began living in the area just west of the packing plants between Ashland Avenue and South Robey Street and bounded on the north by 43rd Street and on the south by 47th Street. At first, the residents were overwhelmingly Irish and German—60% Irish and 30% German. Officially designated the "Town of Lake" until its incorporation into the City of Chicago in about 1870, the neighborhood was known locally as "Packingtown." However, much later in the 1930s, the community would become known as the "Back of the Yards."

The overwhelming sensation about the neighborhood was the smell of the community caused not just by the packing plants located immediately to the east, but also by the 345-acre Chicago Union Stock Yards containing 2,300 pens of livestock, located further east from the packing plants.

Back of the Yards Community
Settlement in the area that was to become known as the "Back of the Yards" began in the 1850s before there were any meat packers or stockyards in the area. At this time the area was known as the "Town of Lake." Indeed, the area would continue to be called Town of Lake until 1939. Witness that the newspaper of the area was called the Town of Lake Journal. Only with the founding of the community organization called the "Back of the Yards Neighborhood Council" in 1939 did the neighborhood west and south of the meat packinghouses start being called the "Back of the Yards." It was a name that the residents proudly claimed as their own. In 1939, the Town of Lake Journal officially changed its name to Back of the Yards Journal.

Pioneers to the area first called "Town of Lake" were S. S. Crocker and John Caffrey. Indeed, Crocker earned the nickname "Father of the Town of Lake." By February 1865 the area was incorporated officially as "Town of Lake" the area still consisted of fewer than 700 persons. In the early 1860s the meat packing industry of the United States was still located in Cincinnati, Ohio, the original "Porkopolis" of the pre-Civil War era. However, with the end of the American Civil War, the meat packing industry had started to move westward along with the westward migration of the population of the United States. For the meat packing industry moving west meant coming to Chicago. As early as 1827, Archibauld Clybourn had established himself as a butcher in a log slaughter house on the north branch of the Chicago River and supplied most to the garrison of Fort Dearborn. Other small butchers came later. In 1848, the Bull's Head Stockyard began operations at Madison Street and Ogden Avenue on the West Side of Chicago. Operations for this early stockyard, however, still meant holding and feeding cattle and hogs in transit to meat packing plants further east—Indianapolis and, of course, Cincinnati.

Decline and current use

The prosperity of the stockyards was due to both the concentration of railroads and the evolution of refrigerated railroad cars. Its decline was due to further advances in post–World War II transportation and distribution. Direct sales of livestock from breeders to packers, facilitated by advancement in interstate trucking, made it cheaper to slaughter animals where they were raised and excluded the intermediary stockyards. At first, the major meatpacking companies resisted change, but Swift and Armour both surrendered and vacated their plants in the Yards in the 1950s.

In 1971, the area bounded by Pershing Road, Ashland, Halsted, and 47th Street became The Stockyards Industrial Park. The neighborhood to the west and south of the industrial park is still known as Back of the Yards, and is still home to a thriving immigrant population.

Gate

A remnant of the Union Stock Yard Gate still arches over Exchange Avenue, next to the firefighters' memorial, and can be seen by those driving along Halsted Street. This limestone gate, marking the entrance to the stockyards, survives as one of the few relics of Chicago's heritage of livestock and meatpacking. The bovine head decoration over the central arch is thought to represent "Sherman", a prize-winning bull named after John B. Sherman, a founder of the Union Stock Yard and Transit Company. The gate is a designated U.S. National Historic Landmark.

Impact

The stockyards are considered one of the chief forces that molded the animal–industrial complex into its present form under contemporary capitalism. According to Kim Stallwood, Chicago and its stockyards from 1865 are one of the two milestones that mark the shift in human attitudes toward animals that empowered the animal–industrial complex, the other being the post–World War II developments such as intensive factory farms, industrial fishing, and xenotransplantation. According to sociologist David Nibert, the Chicago slaughterhouses were significant economic powers of the early 20th century and were "famous for the cruel, rapid-paced killing and disassembly of enormous numbers of animals."

In popular culture
In 1906 Upton Sinclair published The Jungle, uncovering the horrid conditions in the stockyards around the start of the 20th century. 
The stockyards are referred to in Carl Sandburg's poem Chicago: "proud to be Hog Butcher, Tool Maker, Stacker of Wheat, Player with Railroads and Freight Handler to the Nation." 
Frank Sinatra mentioned the yards in his 1964 song "My Kind of Town", and the stockyards receive a mention in the opening chapter of Thomas Pynchon's novel Against the Day. 
The Skip James song "Hard Times Killing Floor Blues" refers to the nickname of the slaughter part of the stockyards during the Great Depression in the 1930s. 
The Yards were a major tourist stop, with visitors such as Rudyard Kipling, Paul Bourget and Sarah Bernhardt. 
The play Saint Joan of the Stockyards, a version of the story of Joan of Arc by Bertolt Brecht, takes place in the stockyards. 
The 1950 film Union Station with William Holden has the final scene at the Union Stockyards.
In "Rose Fights Back", a 1989 episode of The Golden Girls, Rose Nylund reveals that she and her husband Charlie splurged on a trip to the Chicago Stock Yards as a romantic trip for their 20th anniversary.
In J. M. Coetzee's novel Elizabeth Costello, the protagonist says, "Chicago showed us the way; it was from the Chicago stockyards that the Nazis learned how to process bodies."
In the 2021 novel The City Beautiful by Aden Polydoros, the characters investigate the owner of a factory in the stockyards for the suspected murder of several Jewish boys in 1893.

See also

Chicago Board of Trade
Chicago Mercantile Exchange
List of union stockyards in the United States

Notes

Bibliography

 Anderson, John. "'Hog butcher for the world' opens shop." Chicago Tribune, January 30, 1997, Chicago ed.: sec. 2, p. 2.
 Barrett, James R. Work and Community in the Jungle: Chicago's Packinghouse Workers, 1894–1922 (U of Illinois Press, 1990).
 Cronon, William. Nature's Metropolis: Chicago and the Great West (2009).
 Grant, W. Jos. Illustrated History of the Union Stockyards. Chicago, 1901.
 Halpern, Rick. Down on the Killing Floor: Black and White Workers in Chicago's Packinghouses, 1904–54. (Chicago: University of Illinois Press, 1997).
 Hirsch, Susan, and Robert I. Goler. A City Comes of Age: Chicago in the 1890s. Chicago: Chicago Historical Society, 1990.
 Holt, Glen E., and Dominic A. Pacyga. Chicago: A Historical Guide to the Neighborhoods: the Loop and South Side. (Chicago: Chicago Historical Society, 1979).
 Horowitz, Roger, Negro and White, Unite and Fight (University of Illinois Press: Urbana, Illinois, 1997).
 Jablonsky, Thomas J. Pride in the Jungle: Community and Everyday Life in Back of the Yards Chicago. Baltimore: Johns Hopkins University Press, 1993.
 Klein, Aaron E., New York Central System (Smithmark Publishers Inc.: New York, 1995).
 Liste, J. G., and George Schoettle. Union Stockyards Fire Photo Album. CHS: 1934.
 Mahoney, Olivia. Go West! Chicago and American Expansion. Chicago: Chicago Historical Society, 1999.
 McLaughlin, John Gerard, Irish Chicago (Arcadia Publishing: Charleston, South Carolina, 2003).
 Pacyga, Dominic. Polish Immigrants and Industrial Chicago: Workers on the South Side, 1880–1922. Columbus: Ohio State University Press, 1991.
 Pacyga, Dominic, and Ellen Skerrett. Chicago: City of Neighborhoods. Chicago: Loyola University Press, 1986.
 Parkhurst, William. History of the Yards, 1865–1953. Chicago, 1953.
 Pate, J'Nell L., Livestock Hotels: America's Historic Stockyards (Texas Christian University Press: Fort Worth, Texas, 2005). 
 Rice, William. "City creates nation's livestock center." Chicago Tribune, July 16, 1997, Chicago ed.: sec. 7, p. 7b.
 Skaggs, Jimmy. Prime Cut: Livestock Raising and Meatpacking in the U.S. College Station, Texas: Texas A&M University Press, 1986.
 Slayton, Robert A. Back of the Yards: The Making of a Local Democracy. (Chicago: The University of Chicago Press, 1986).
 Street, Paul. "Packinghouse Blues." Chicago History 18, no. 3 (1989): 68–85.

 Swist, Jeannette, Back of the Yards'' (Arcadia Publishing: Charleston, South Carolina, 2007).
 Chicago (Ill.). Fire Dept. Report of the Fire Marshal. 1910. pp. 23–24.

External links 

Chicago Historical Society's "History Files"
History of the Yards  in A Biography of America
 Chicago Stockyards Industrial Park Photographs  at the Newberry Library

Meat processing in the United States
South Side, Chicago
Defunct agriculture companies of the United States
Union Stock Yard and Transit Co.
Chicago Landmarks
Defunct companies based in Chicago
1865 establishments in Illinois
Meat companies
Companies established in 1865